Max Winter (January 9, 1870 Tárnok, Hungary – July 11, 1937 Hollywood, California, United States) was an Austrian journalist, writer and politician of the SDAP. In 1923 he founded a feminist magazine, Die Unzufriedene, with Paula Hons which he edited until 1931.

He was instrumental in acquiring use of part of the Schönbrunn Palace as a school. The street Max Winter Platz in Vienna is named after him.

References 

1870 births
1937 deaths
People from Pest County
People from the Kingdom of Hungary
Social Democratic Party of Austria politicians
Members of the Austrian House of Deputies (1911–1918)
Members of the Provisional National Assembly